Veronika Herdová (born 11 December 1988) is a Czech curler.

Teams

References

External links

Czech national women team (2014) - Czech Curling Federation (web archive)
Kubešková returns to world stage in Saint John - Curling Canada – 2014 Ford World Women's Curling Championship
Video: 

Living people
1988 births
Czech female curlers
Sportspeople from Prague